The Clemson Tigers men's basketball team is a college basketball program that represents Clemson University and competes in the NCAA Division I. Clemson is a founding member of the Atlantic Coast Conference.

Clemson sponsored its first men's basketball team in the 1911–12 season, winning its first conference championship in 1939, and the ACC regular season in 1990. The Tigers have never won the ACC basketball tournament since its inception in 1953.  The Tigers have reached the NCAA tournament 13 times in the modern era (1980, 1987, 1989, 1990, 1996, 1997, 1998, 2008, 2009, 2010, 2011, 2018, 2021) since the tournament expansion in 1980, advancing to the NCAA Sweet 16 four times (1980, 1990, 1997, 2018), with their best performance reaching the Elite Eight that very same year.

Clemson's home court is Littlejohn Coliseum and has been the scene of 55 Clemson wins over ranked teams (23 in the Top 10) since 1968, including a victory over #1 Duke in 1980, a 75–65 victory over #1 North Carolina in 2001, and a 74–47 victory over #3 Duke in 2009. The Clemson basketball programs have won roughly 75% of their games played in Littlejohn, making it one of the ACC's toughest road venues.

Clemson's current head coach is Brad Brownell.

Team history

Clemson's basketball history had an unusual beginning. The Tigers first two basketball games were both played in Greenville, South Carolina on February 9, 1912, a 46–12 win at Furman, followed by a 78–6 victory over the Butler Guards later that evening. Brothers John and Frank Erwin scored a combined 74 points in their second game; John Erwin's 58 points still stand as Clemson's single game scoring record, unique in college basketball for not being broken in over a century since the program's inaugural day. Clemson won its first seven games in the program's history, the longest streak to open a program among the current 15 ACC schools. Former Pittsburgh Nationals player Frank Dobson was Clemson's first basketball coach, taking the Tigers to a 13–5 record in the first two seasons.

Southern Conference:  The Tigers began play in the Southern Conference in 1921, and in 1922–23 had an 11–6 finish. Josh Cody coached for five seasons, the longest tenure for a Clemson Basketball coach in the first 25 years. In 1928–29 the Tigers won 15 games, a school record, and then followed that with a 16–9 mark. Cody pulled off the first huge upset in Clemson basketball history when the Tigers defeated Adolph Rupp's 10–1 Kentucky Wildcats, 29–26, at Clemson on Valentine's Day in 1931. From 1931–40, Joe Davis coached Clemson to 101 victories, including 44 wins on the road. Davis still has the best winning percentage in Clemson history on the road and led the Tigers to a 15–3 (.833) mark in 1934–35. In the 1938–39 season, the Tigers won 10 of their last 11 games to close the regular season. Banks McFadden, eventual All-American in both football and basketball averaged 11.8 points per game to lead the team as the starting pivot to four victories. It was an incredible run in the tournament as Clemson beat North Carolina, 44–43, Wake Forest, 30–28, Davidson 49–33 and Maryland 39–27 to clinch the Southern Conference title. McFadden's best year as coach was the 1951–52 season when the Tigers were 17–7 overall and 11–4 in the Conference.

Atlantic Coast Conference

In 1953, Clemson became a founding member of the Atlantic Coast Conference. In the 1954–55 season, Bill Yarborough averaged 28.3 points per game, 4th best in the nation, and best in the ACC. In 1958, Vince Yockel became the first Clemson player to make first team All-ACC. Press Maravich, father of basketball legend Pete Maravich, coached the Tigers to a 96–94 double overtime victory against a #8 NC State team. Jim Brennan became the first Clemson player to make first-team All-ACC Tournament in 1962 with 34-points against #8 Duke in the semifinals before losing to Billy Packer and the Wake Forest Demon Deacons, 77–66. In 1963–64, coach Bobby Roberts guided the Tigers to an 8–6 record in the ACC. The season included the only regular season sweep of North Carolina in school history. Roberts beat the Tar Heels and Dean Smith, 66–64, in double overtime at Clemson to open the season; and beat them again, 97–90, in double overtime in Charlotte at the North–South Doubleheader. In 1966–67. Clemson won seven straight ACC games including consecutive wins over Wake Forest, #14 Duke, North Carolina State and #4 North Carolina. It was the first sweep of "the North Carolina ACC schools" in ACC history. Clemson finished with a 17–8 record and 9–5 record in the ACC. Randy Mahaffey was a first-team All-ACC selection who went on to become Clemson's first professional player. His teammate Jim Sutherland averaged 17 points a game and was the first Clemson athlete in any sport to win the Jim Weaver Award as the ACC's top scholar athlete.

In the 1970s, Tree Rollins ushered in a new era in Clemson basketball when he matriculated to Tigertown for the 1973–74 season. He changed the image of Clemson basketball more than any other player. At 7–2 he was a shot-blocking phenomenon who burst on the national scene in just his second game when he had 22 points, 20 rebounds and nine blocked shots against St. John's. Rollins started 110 games in a row, a national record at the time. His sophomore year, 1974–75, he joined forces with Skip Wise to take Clemson to its first top 20 final ranking and its first postseason NIT tournament bid. The Tigers defeated 3rd ranked Maryland, 10th ranked North Carolina and 4th ranked NC State at home. Wise was named first-team All-ACC the first true freshman in league history to obtain that honor.

Bill Foster

In 1975, Bill Foster was brought in to further build the program. He had an impeccable reputation and was coming from a UNC Charlotte program that he helped advance.  When Tree Rollins decided not to turn professional, Foster coached the Tigers to 22–6 record, the program's ninth straight year with an improved winning percentage. Prior to his final game, Rollins had his #30 jersey retired, the first athlete in Clemson history so honored. It was a fitting way to honor Rollins who averaged a double-double for four years and is still first in ACC history in blocked shots, before starting his 18-year career in the NBA. Bill Foster did a remarkable job in keeping Clemson at a winning level. He won 100 games in his first 147, still fifth in ACC history in terms of fewest games required to get 100 wins. He had an ability to find diamonds in the rough that kept Clemson competitive in the ACC: Bobby Conrad, Horace Grant, Harvey Grant, & Larry Nance an eventual All-West regional choice in the 1980 NCAA tournament and NBA All-Star. Foster's 1979–80 team defeated six top 20 teams during the year, including #1 ranked Duke on January 9, 1980 in overtime, 87–82. Clemson went to the NCAA Tournament defeating Danny Ainge and BYU in Round 2 before being eliminated by Larry Brown and UCLA in the Elite Eight.

Cliff Ellis

Cliff Ellis became the winningest coach in Clemson basketball history on a total victories basis (177–128). He took the Tigers to eight post-season tournaments, including three NCAA tournaments, and coached a record 25 win season in 1987, with ACC Player of the Year and future NBA champion Horace Grant. Ellis coached Clemson to the ACC regular season title in 1990, with the Tigers posting a 24–8 record that year behind Dale Davis and Elden Campbell, ending in a last second shot by UConn in the Sweet 16. Ellis set 33 Clemson coaching records, including ACC regular season victories, victories at home and home winning percentage. The Tigers won 22 games over top 25 teams in Ellis' ten years at Clemson, including an upset of 12th-ranked Florida State in the 1993 ACC Tournament, and a victory over #2 North Carolina in 1994. Ellis was also named ACC Coach-of-the-Year in 1987 and 1990, the only Clemson coach to win that award.

Rick Barnes

Rick Barnes was the first coach in Clemson history to take the Tigers to the NCAA Tournament three consecutive years. Barnes coached Clemson into post-season play every year of his tenure, and to the NCAA's in 1996, 1997, and 1998. The Tiger's top season was his third year, when he coached the Tigers to a 16–1 start and a #2 national ranking. The season opened with a 79–71 overtime victory against defending National Champion Kentucky. The team ended the season 23–10 and ranked #8 in the final USA Today poll. Picked last in the ACC prior to his first season, he shocked the basketball world by winning his first ten games, including a 75–70 victory over 9th ranked Duke in Cameron Indoor Stadium. His second season featured an 18–11 record, including Clemson's first-ever ACC Tournament victory over #20 North Carolina . The Tigers were ranked fifth in the nation in the pre-season poll of 1997–1998, an example of the level of respect that Barnes had brought back to the program. His fiery on the floor interactions with Dean Smith and teams' physical style of play made him a basketball fan favorite. Clemson defeated three top-25 teams in 1997–1998, including sixth-ranked South Carolina. Barnes concluded his four years with a 74–48 record, a 60.7 percent winning mark before leaving for the University of Texas.

Larry Shyatt

Barnes' assistant Larry Shyatt, who was a part of Clemson's success in the three seasons prior, took over as head coach for five seasons from 1998–2003.  In his first season, Shyatt led the Tigers to a 20-win season (20–15). The Tigers advanced to the 1999 NIT Championship Game before losing by one point, 60–61, to California.  At the time, Shyatt became only the fourth first-year coach in Atlantic Coast Conference (ACC) history to guide his team to a 20-win season. Also during his time as head coach at Clemson, the 2000–01 team set a school record for three-point field goals in a season and recorded one of the biggest wins in school history with a 75–65 win over No. 1 ranked North Carolina on February 18, 2001, ending an 18-game winning streak for the Tar Heels.

Oliver Purnell

After several lackluster seasons and renovations to Littlejohn Coliseum, Oliver Purnell rebuilt the program steadily, improving each subsequent season. The trademark of Purnell's teams was full court pressure defense. In 2008, he guided the Tigers to a third-place 10–6 record in the Atlantic Coast Conference and a runner-up position in the ACC Tournament in Charlotte, losing to North Carolina by 5 points. The 2008–09 season was record-breaking on many fronts. Purnell's team finished with a 23–9 record, a .719 winning percentage, and a No. 24 final ranking in the Associated Press poll. Among Clemson's victims that season were #3 Duke, who lost to the #10 Tigers by a score of 74–47 at Littlejohn Coliseum. It was the largest margin of victory ever for Clemson against a ranked opponent. Coaching players such as Cliff Hammonds, K.C. Rivers, and Trevor Booker, Purnell finished with a record of 138–88 and guided the Tigers to 3 NCAA appearances.

Brad Brownell

Currently, Brad Brownell is the Clemson head basketball coach. In his first season in 2010, Brownell guided the Tigers to a 4th place ACC finish, and a 2nd round finish in the NCAA Tournament and set a record with 22 wins (9 ACC), the most ever by a rookie coach. Jerai Grant and Demontez Stitt became the first scholarship players in school history to be consistent contributors to four straight NCAA Tournament teams. Brownell's second team went 16–15 and 8–8 in ACC play, a record fifth straight season the Tigers were .500 or better in conference games, defeating three teams that advanced to the NCAA Tournament, including NC State.  In 2013, the Tigers suffered a 13–18 overall record but were impressive in several statistical categories, yielding just 60.1 points per game, finishing 2nd in the ACC in Scoring Defense, and setting a record for fewest turnovers.  Brownell's defensive style of play continued to stifle teams into the 2014 season, as the Tigers, led by blocking and scoring leader K. J. McDaniels, were ranked 2nd in the nation in Scoring Defense (56.8 ppg), which helped elevate Clemson to a 72–59 upset of #16 Duke on January 11.  The Tigers were seeded 6th in the 2014 ACC tournament and advanced to the semifinals of the NIT at Madison Square Garden.  On January 16, 2016, the Clemson Tigers defeated #8 Miami marking the first time Clemson has defeated three consecutive top 25 opponents.  The two games prior to Clemson defeated #16 Louisville and #9 Duke.  After the 2016-2017 season, it was announced that Brownell would stay on as Clemson head coach with a contract extension until 2021.   In the 2017–18 the Tigers went 25-10 (9-9) and Brownell and the Tigers made their first appearance in the NCAA tournament since 2010–11. Clemson would beat #12 seed New Mexico State 79–68 and #4 seed Auburn 84–53 before losing to #1 seeded Kansas 80–76. In the 2019–20 season, the Tigers beat #3 Duke at home and North Carolina back to back and won in Chapel Hill for the first time ever. the Tigers also beat #5 Louisville and #6 Florida State and finished with a 16–15 (9–11) record  and finished 9th in the ACC.

Awards

Retired Numbers

Notes

All-Americans
 Banks McFadden (1939 Helms Foundation)
 Tree Rollins (1977 Helms, 3rd Team – AP)
 Billy Williams (1980 Helms, Honorable Mention – AP)
 Horace Grant (1987 Consensus 2nd Team)
 Elden Campbell & Dale Davis (1990 Honorable Mention – AP)
 Sharone Wright (1994 Honorable Mention – AP)

Clemson Ring of Honor 
 Banks McFadden
 Dale Davis

ACC Player of the Year
Horace Grant – 1987

ACC Defensive Player of the Year
K. J. McDaniels – 2014

ACC Freshman of the Year
Skip Wise – 1975
Greg Buckner – 1995

ACC Most Improved Player
Jaron Blossomgame – 2016

ACC All-Defensive Team
Greg Buckner – 1997
Vernon Hamilton – 2006 & 2007
James Mays – 2007 & 2008
Cliff Hammonds – 2008
Trevor Booker – 2009 & 2010
K. J. McDaniels – 2014
Landry Nnoko – 2016

ACC Coach of the Year 
Cliff Ellis – 1987, 1990

All-Southern Conference
Banks McFadden – 1938, 1939, 1940
Johnny Snee – 1952

All-ACC First Team

Vince Yockel – 1958
Choppy Patterson – 1960
Randy Mahaffey – 1967
Skip Wise – 1975
Billy Williams – 1980
Horace Grant – 1987
Dale Davis & Elden Campbell – 1990
Terrell McIntyre – 1998
Will Solomon – 2000
Ed Scott – 2003
Trevor Booker – 2010
K. J. McDaniels – 2014
Jaron Blossomgame – 2016
Hunter Tyson – 2023

All-ACC Second Team

Bill Yarborough – 1955 & 1956
Vince Yockel – 1956
Choppy Patterson – 1961
Jim Brennan – 1963 & 1964
Randy Mahaffey – 1965
Jim Sutherland – 1965, 1967
Butch Zatezalo – 1968, 1969, 1970
Tree Rollins – 1975, 1976, 1977
Stan Rome – 1977
Larry Nance – 1981
Vince Hamilton – 1982
Horace Grant – 1986
Elden Campbell – 1989
Dale Davis – 1991
Sharone Wright – 1994
Greg Buckner – 1997, 1998
Terrell McIntyre – 1997, 1999
Will Solomon – 2001
K. C. Rivers – 2008
Trevor Booker – 2009
 Marquise Reed – 2018
 Aamir Simms - 2021

All-ACC Third Team

Sharone Wright & Chris Whitney – 1993
Devin Gray – 1994
Terrell McIntyre – 1998
Ed Scott – 2002
Sharrod Ford – 2005
Cliff Hammonds – 2008
Demontez Stitt – 2011
Devin Booker – 2013
PJ Hall – 2023

NBA Players

Trevor Booker  
Sharrod Ford 
Will Solomon
Harold Jamison
Greg Buckner
Devin Gray
Sharone Wright
Chris Whitney
Dale Davis
Elden Campbell
Horace Grant
Larry Nance
Tree Rollins
Skip Wise
Randy Mahaffey
K.J. McDaniels
Jaron Blossomgame

Postseason

NCAA tournament results
The Tigers have appeared in the NCAA tournament 13 times. Their combined record is 11–13.^*

NIT results
The Tigers have appeared in the National Invitation Tournament (NIT) 18 times. Their combined record is 19–18.

Home courts

Clemson Field House/Fike Field House: 1930–1968
Littlejohn Coliseum: November 30, 1968 – February 23, 2002; January 5, 2003–2015; 2016 – present
Civic Center of Anderson: November 13, 2002 – December 31, 2002, (For eight games as Littlejohn Coliseum was undergoing renovations)
Bon Secours Wellness Arena, Greenville: 2015–2016 season, (While Littlejohn Coliseum was undergoing renovations)

Coaching history

Current coaching staff
Head coach: Brad Brownell
Assistant coach: Dick Bender
Assistant coach: Antonio Reynolds-Dean
Assistant coach: Steve Smith
Director of Basketball Operations: Matt Bucklin
Special assistant to the head coach: Marty Simmons

Season-by-season results

Statistics

All-time leaders

Points

Rebounds

Assists

Steals

Blocks

References

External links